Scott George Borthwick (born 19 April 1990) is an English cricketer. He is a left-handed batsman and leg-break bowler who captains Durham. He was born in Sunderland.

Borthwick played in the North East Premier League for Philadelphia during the 2005 campaign, and played sporadic matches for Durham's Second XI in 2006. Borthwick played for Durham Academy in the North East Premier League 2007 and 2008 competitions. He also represented Tynemouth Cricket Club, as their Durham contract player for the 2009 season, with his performances safeguarding them from relegation.

Borthwick made his Twenty20 debut for Durham against Lancashire, and despite not batting, he bowled four overs, taking 3–23.

In May 2009 Borthwick took two catches while fielding as substitute for England in the second Test against the West Indies at the Riverside Ground.

Borthwick's uncle, David, played one List-A match for Northumberland in 1994.

In 2013 Borthwick was promoted up the order and finished Durham's top scorer as they won the County Championship, scoring 1022 runs and also taking 28 wickets (fewer than only Graham Onions, Chris Rushworth and Ben Stokes), though he still described himself as "a legspinner who bats".

Borthwick left for Surrey at the end of the 2016 season but returned to Durham for 2021.

International career
Borthwick was announced as a member of the England One Day International (ODI) squad for their match against Ireland in August 2011. In the one-off match he scored 15 runs off 9 balls late in England's innings, and bowled just 1 over, conceding 13 runs. He made his Twenty20 International (T20I) début on 25 September 2011 in the match against the West Indies. Borthwick was touted in December 2013 as a future Test cricket bowler by retiring England bowler Graeme Swann, who said:

He was subsequently called up to the England Test squad for the Ashes (alongside James Tredwell) in time for the 4th Ashes Test as a replacement for Swann.

He eventually made his Test debut in the fifth Test at Sydney, alongside fellow debutants Gary Ballance and Boyd Rankin. Borthwick took four wickets, including 3-33 in the second innings, but England lost heavily to complete a 5-0 Ashes series defeat. Borthwick has not played international cricket since.

As of July 2022, he holds an unusual record as the bowler with the most Test wickets without ever bowling a maiden.

References

External links

1990 births
Living people
English cricketers
England Test cricketers
England One Day International cricketers
England Twenty20 International cricketers
Durham cricketers
Wellington cricketers
Surrey cricketers
Cricketers from Sunderland
Chilaw Marians Cricket Club cricketers